Ceinture 4001 to 4005, was a class of five 4-8-0T tank locomotives designed by the Chemins de fer de l'Ouest for the Syndicat d'Exploitation des Chemins de fer de Ceinture de Paris.

They were built by Société Alsacienne de Constructions Mécaniques (SACM) at their Belfort Works in 1904

In 1934 they passed to the Chemins de fer du Nord, who renumbered them Nord 4.001 to 4.005.

In 1938 at the formation of the SNCF, they became 240.TA.1 to 240.TA.5.

One locomotive, 240.TA.2 was destroyed in World War II and written-off the books in September 1944. The remaining four locomotives continued in service until they were all retired in September 1948. None were preserved.

See also
List of Chemins de Fer du Nord locomotives

References 

Steam locomotives of France
4-8-0T locomotives
SACM locomotives
Railway locomotives introduced in 1904
2′D n4vt locomotives

Scrapped locomotives